William Cox Ellis (May 5, 1787 – December 13, 1871) was a member of the United States House of Representatives from Pennsylvania.

Biography 
William Cox Ellis was born in Fort Muncy, Pennsylvania, son of William and Mercy Cox Ellis. He attended the public schools, and graduated from the Friends’ School near Pennsdale, Pennsylvania, in 1803. He was deputy surveyor general from 1803 to 1810 and cashier of the Union and Northumberland County Bank from 1810 to 1818. He studied law, was admitted to the bar in 1817 and commenced practice in Muncy, Pennsylvania. He married Rebecca Morris in 1810.

Political career 
Ellis was elected as a Republican in 1820 to the Seventeenth Congress, but resigned before the Congress assembled. He was an unsuccessful candidate for reelection to fill the vacancy caused by his own resignation. Ellis was elected as a Jackson Federalist candidate to the Eighteenth Congress. He was a member of the Pennsylvania House of Representatives in 1825 and 1826. He became affiliated with the Republican Party in 1856. He resumed the practice of law in Muncy and died there in 1871. Interment in Muncy Cemetery.

References

External links 
The Political Graveyard

 

1787 births
1871 deaths
Politicians from Williamsport, Pennsylvania
Pennsylvania Republicans
Federalist Party members of the United States House of Representatives from Pennsylvania
Democratic-Republican Party members of the United States House of Representatives from Pennsylvania
Jacksonian members of the United States House of Representatives from Pennsylvania
19th-century American politicians